Maxwell Wayne Trenorden (born 1 August 1948 in Wyalkatchem, Western Australia) is an Australian politician. He was a Nationals member of the Western Australian Legislative Assembly from 1986 to September 2008, representing the electorate of Avon. Trenorden was elected as the Nationals member for the Agricultural region in the Legislative Council in 2008.

Educated in Wyalkatchem Primary then later at Scotch College, Perth, Trenorden worked as a farmer in his early years before spending 18 years as an insurance agent and broker.
Trenorden regained the seat of Avon from Ken McIver (ALP) in 1986 and has been successful in holding the seat since.
Appointed as leader of the Nationals in 2001, Trenorden held the position until 2005. He became Father of the House of the Legislative Assembly in 2005.

Trenorden stood down from the Legislative Assembly just prior to the 2008 election and contested the election as the lead candidate for the Agricultural region in the Legislative Council. Trenorden gained the seat as the sole Nationals member.

Trenorden lost Nationals preselection prior to the 2013 state election and opted to head an independent ticket for the Agricultural region.

References

1948 births
Living people
Members of the Western Australian Legislative Assembly
Members of the Western Australian Legislative Council
People educated at Scotch College, Perth
People from Wyalkatchem, Western Australia
National Party of Australia members of the Parliament of Western Australia
21st-century Australian politicians